In the mathematical field of graph theory, a Platonic graph is a graph that has one of the Platonic solids as its skeleton. There are 5 Platonic graphs, and all of them are regular, polyhedral (and therefore by necessity also 3-vertex-connected, vertex-transitive, edge-transitive and planar graphs), and also Hamiltonian graphs.

 Tetrahedral graph – 4 vertices, 6 edges
 Octahedral graph – 6 vertices, 12 edges
 Cubical graph – 8 vertices, 12 edges
 Icosahedral graph – 12 vertices, 30 edges
 Dodecahedral graph – 20 vertices, 30 edges

See also
Regular map (graph theory)
Archimedean graph
Wheel graph

References

External links
 

Graph families
Regular graphs
Planar graphs